Fregiécourt is a village and a former municipality in the district of Porrentruy in the canton of Jura in Switzerland. Since January 1, 2009 it is a part of the new municipality La Baroche.

References

External links

Former municipalities of the canton of Jura